Panteras de Aguascalientes (English: Aguascalientes Panthers) is a Mexican professional basketball team that is based in Aguascalientes City, Mexico. They play in the Liga Nacional de Baloncesto Profesional (LNBP). Their home arena is Gimnasio "Hermanos Carreón". It is one of the few teams that have remained in the LNBP since 2003, where in its first year in this league were crowned champions at the hands of coach Francisco Ramirez and one of the best foreigners on the shoulders of Devon Ford, in addition that only had 7 players in the squad in that year and with a directive without the ability to pay the salaries of the players during the playoffs.

Players

Current roster

Notable players
- Set a club record or won an individual award as a professional player.
- Played at least one official international match for his senior national team at any time.
  Israel Gutiérrez
  Ernesto Oglivie

References

External links
LatinBasket.com Team Page

Basketball teams in Mexico
Aguascalientes City
Sports teams in Aguascalientes
Basketball teams established in 1972
1972 establishments in Mexico